Adriano Moraes (born April 21, 1988) is a Brazilian mixed martial artist who competes in the Flyweight division of ONE Championship. He is a former three time ONE Championship Flyweight World Champion. He is currently ranked #1 in the ONE Championship Flyweight rankings.

Background
Moraes was born in Brasilia, Brazil and abandoned by his mother days after birth. He was taken to an orphanage where he lived for three years before being adopted. He was an active child who partook in judo and capoeira. Wanting to learn how to better defend himself, Moraes took up Brazilian jiu-jitsu.

As a member of Constrictor Team, Moraes shined as a submission specialist. Moraes developed his skills and competed in jiu-jitsu tournaments before transitioning into MMA. He made his MMA debut in 2011. He would win the NAGA No-Gi Pro Division Championship in 2014 prior to earning his black belt.

Mixed martial arts career
On September 4, 2011, Moraes made his professional mixed martial arts debut at Precol Combat 5 against Ismael Bonfim. Moraes won by first-round submission (guillotine choke). He would reel off six more victories before joining the longtime promotion Shooto in 2013.

ONE Championship
On November 15, 2013, Moraes made his ONE Championship debut at ONE FC: Warrior Spirit. He lost a split decision to Yusup Saadulaev.

First title reign
After back-to-back wins, Moraes met Geje Eustaquio for the vacant ONE Flyweight Championship. Moraes would capture his first world championship with a second-round guillotine choke on September 12, 2014 at ONE FC: Age of Champions.

Moraes would successfully defend the belt against Riku Shibuya on March 13, 2015 before dropping the title in a close split decision to Kairat Akhmetov on November 21, 2015 at ONE: Dynasty of Champions.

Second title reign
On August 13, 2016, Moraes captured gold once again as he became the interim ONE flyweight champion by defeating Tilek Batyrov via rear-naked choke at ONE: Heroes of the World.

On August 5, 2017, Moraes and Akhmetov fought in a flyweight unification bout. Moraes won the fight by unanimous decision and became the ONE flyweight championship undisputed champion.

On November 10, 2017, Moraes successfully defended the title against Danny Kingad at ONE: Legends of the World by rear-naked choke in the first round.

Moraes was scheduled to defend his title against Reece McLaren at ONE Championship: Visions of Victory on March 9, 2018. However, he suffered a knee injury and was forced to withdraw.

Moraes was set to make his second title defense against Geje Eustaquio at ONE Championship: Pinnacle of Power on June 23, 2018. He lost the fight and the title via split decision.

Third title reign
The pair met in a trilogy match at ONE Championship: Hero's Ascent on January 25, 2019. Moraes re-captured the championship via unanimous decision.

As the first bout of his new four-fight, two-year contract, Adriano Moraes was scheduled to defend his title against ONE Flyweight World Grand Prix Champion and former UFC Flyweight Champion Demetrious Johnson at ONE Championship: Reign of Dynasties on April 11, 2020. The fight was postponed due to the COVID-19 pandemic.

After being delayed, Moraes defended his title against Johnson at ONE on TNT 1 on April 7, 2021. The event was held at the Singapore Indoor Stadium in Kallang, Singapore and will be broadcast on TNT during US prime time. Moraes won the bout via TKO in round two.

Moraes next defended his title against Yuya Wakamatsu at ONE: X on March 6, 2022. He won the fight via a guillotine choke submission in the third round.

Moraes made the third title defense of his third title reign against Demetrious Johnson at ONE on Prime Video 1 on August 27, 2022. He lost the bout via KO due to a flying knee in the fourth round.

The trilogy bout between Moraes and Johnson for the ONE Flyweight World Championship is scheduled on May 5, 2023, at ONE Fight Night 10.

Legal issues
In late 2021 news surfaced that Moraes's managers, Alex Davis and Samir Nadaf, had filed a lawsuit against him for breach of contract. The managers claim that Moraes unilaterally terminated their contract and has approximately $113,000 USD worth of unpaid provisions from fighter salaries and sponsorships.

Championships and accomplishments
 ONE Championship
 ONE Flyweight Championship (Three times)
 Four successful title defenses (overall)
 One successful title defense (first reign)
 One successful title defense (second reign)
 Two successful title defense (third reign)
 Interim ONE Flyweight Championship (One time)
 MMA Knockout of the Year 2021 
Shooto
Shooto Brazil Flyweight Championship
World MMA Awards
2021 Upset of the Year vs. Demetrious Johnson at ONE on TNT 1

Mixed martial arts record

|-
|Loss
|align=center|20–4
|Demetrious Johnson
|KO (flying knee)
|ONE on Prime Video 1
|
|align=center|4
|align=center|3:50
|Kallang, Singapore
|
|-
|Win
|align=center|20–3
|Yuya Wakamatsu
|Submission (guillotine choke)
|ONE: X
|
|align=center|3
|align=center|3:58
|Kallang, Singapore
|
|-
|Win
|align=center|19–3
|Demetrious Johnson
|KO (knee)
|ONE on TNT 1
|
|align=center|2
|align=center|2:24
|Kallang, Singapore
|
|-
|Win
|align=center|18–3
|Geje Eustaquio
|Decision (unanimous)
|ONE: Hero's Ascent
|
|align=center|5
|align=center|5:00
|Manila, Philippines
|
|-
|Loss
|align=center|17–3
|Geje Eustaquio
|Decision (split)
|ONE: Pinnacle of Power
|
|align=center|5
|align=center|5:00
|Macau, China
|
|-
|Win
|align=center|17–2
|Danny Kingad
|Submission (rear naked choke)
|ONE: Legends of the World
|
|align=center|1
|align=center|4:45
|Pasay, Philippines
|
|-
|Win
|align=center|16–2
|Kairat Akhmetov
| Decision (unanimous)
|ONE: Kings & Conquerors
|
|align=center| 5
|align=center| 5:00
|Macau, China
|
|-
|Win
|align=center|15–2
|Tilek Batyrov
|Submission (rear naked choke)
|ONE: Heroes of the World
|
|align=center|2
|align=center|4:49
|Macau, China
|
|-
|Win
|align=center|14–2
|Eugene Toquero
|Submission (brabo choke)
|ONE: Union of Warriors
|
|align=center|1
|align=center|4:53
|Yangon, Myanmar
|
|-
|Loss
|align=center|13–2
|Kairat Akhmetov
|Decision (split)
|ONE: Dynasty of Champions 4
|
|align=center|5
|align=center|5:00
|Beijing, China
|
|-
|Win
|align=center|13–1
|Riku Shibuya
|Decision (unanimous)
|ONE: Age of Champions
|
|align=center|5
|align=center|5:00
|Kuala Lumpur, Malaysia
|
|-
|Win
|align=center|12–1
|Geje Eustaquio
|Submission (guillotine choke)
|ONE FC: Rise of the Kingdom
|
|align=center|2
|align=center|3:45
|Phnom Penh, Cambodia
|
|-
|Win
|align=center|11–1
|Kosuke Suzuki
|Submission (arm-triangle choke)
|ONE FC: Era of Champions
|
|align=center|3
|align=center|1:35
|Jakarta, Indonesia
|
|-
|Win
|align=center|10–1
|Yasuhiro Urushitani
|Submission (rear-naked choke)
|ONE FC: War of Nations
|
|align=center|2
|align=center|3:48
|Kuala Lumpur, Malaysia
|
|-
|Loss
|align=center|9–1
|Yusup Saadulaev
|Decision (split)
|ONE FC: Warrior Spirit 
|
|align=center|5
|align=center|5:00
|Kuala Lumpur, Malaysia
|
|-
|Win
|align=center|9–0
|Dileno Lopes
|TKO (kick to the body)
|Shooto Brazil 40
|
|align=center|3
|align=center|1:00
|Manaus, Brazil
|
|-
|Win
|align=center|8–0
|José Marcos Júnior
|Decision (unanimous)
|Shooto Brazil 39
|
|align=center|3
|align=center|5:00
|Brasilia, Brazil
|
|-
|Win
|align=center|7–0
|Carlos Sousa Almeida
|Submission (rear-naked choke)
|Octagon Rounds Fight 2
|
|align=center|2
|align=center|2:20
|Palmas, Brazil
|
|-
|Win
|align=center|6–0
|Aldo Ariel Villalba
|Submission (arm-triangle choke)
|Pro Mix Fight 7
|
|align=center|1
|align=center|1:30
|Campo Grande, Brazil
|
|-
|Win
|align=center|5–0
|Michael William Costa
|Decision (unanimous)
|Shooto Brazil 34
|
|align=center|3
|align=center|5:00
|Brasilia, Brazil
|
|-
|Win
|align=center|4–0
|Leonardo Moura
|Decision (unanimous)
|Encontro Fight 2
|
|align=center|3
|align=center|5:00
|Sao Paulo, Brazil
|
|-
|win
|align=center|3–0
|Jhon Leno
|KO (knee)
|Rockstrike MMA
|
|align=center|1
|align=center|N/A
|Brasilia, Brazil
|
|-
|Win
|align=center|2–0
|James Carvalho
|TKO (elbows)
|Precol Combat 7
|
|align=center|1
|align=center|1:55
|Unaí, Brazil
|
|-
|Win
|align=center|1–0
|Ismael Bonfim
|Submission (guillotine choke)
|Precol Combat 5
|
|align=center|1
|align=center|2:55
|Unaí, Brazil
|
|-

See also
 List of current ONE fighters
 List of current mixed martial arts champions
 List of male mixed martial artists

Notes

References

External links
 Adriano Moraes at ONE
 

1989 births
Living people
Brazilian male mixed martial artists
Flyweight mixed martial artists
Mixed martial artists utilizing Brazilian jiu-jitsu
ONE Championship champions
Brazilian practitioners of Brazilian jiu-jitsu
People awarded a black belt in Brazilian jiu-jitsu
Sportspeople from Brasília